Higüey is a city in the Dominican Republic.

Higüey may also refer to:

Higüey (chiefdom), of the Taíno people; see Chiefdoms of Hispaniola#Chiefdom of Higüey
Higüey, a sector of the city of Aguadilla, Puerto Rico